Donald Hunter (10 March 1927 – 26 March 2008) was a professional footballer, who played for Huddersfield Town, Halifax Town & Southport. He was born in Thorne, Doncaster. Then went on to open butchers and sausage factory Hampton road Southport.

References

Donald Hunter's obituary

1927 births
2008 deaths
People from Thorne, South Yorkshire
Footballers from Doncaster
English footballers
Association football defenders
English Football League players
Huddersfield Town A.F.C. players
Halifax Town A.F.C. players
Southport F.C. players